Oscar Potoker (born Vinnytsia April 26, 1880, death 26 Jun 1935 – Los Angeles, age 55) was a musician and film composer.

Early life
In Russia, Potoker composed chamber works based on Jewish folk music.

Movies and teaching
Potoker composed movie scores from 1929–1935, among them Blonde Venus (1932) with Marlene Dietrich, The Mysterious Dr. Fu Manchu (1929), The Vagabond King (1930), Trailing the Killer (1932), and Hei Tiki (1935). He also trained piano students in theory and harmony.

Automobile accident

Potoker was riding in an automobile film composer Josiah Zuro was driving, October 18, 1930, when the car overturned on Torrey Pines Road, north of San Diego. Zuro, age 42, died in an ambulance on his way to Scripps Memorial Hospital in La Jolla. Potoker was hospitalized seriously injured but recovered. Zuro and Potoker had both lived in the same building, 8439 Sunset Blvd, Hacienda Arms Apartments, according to the 1930 US census.

References

External links
 

1880 births
1935 deaths
20th-century American conductors (music)
20th-century American male musicians
Conductors (music) from the Russian Empire
American film score composers
American male conductors (music)
American male film score composers
Jewish American film score composers
Emigrants from the Russian Empire to France
French emigrants to the United States